Liksom en Herdinna, högtids klädd ("Like a Shepherdess, festively dressed"), is a song by the Swedish poet and performer Carl Michael Bellman from his 1790 collection, Fredman's Epistles, where it is No. 80. The Epistle is subtitled "Angående Ulla Winblads Lustresa til Första Torpet, utom Kattrumps Tullen" (Concerning Ulla Winblad's pleasure-trip to Första Torpet, outside Kattrump Tollgate). It is a pastorale, starting with a near-paraphrase of Nicolas Boileau-Despréaux's French guide to the construction of pastoral verse. That doesn't prevent the supposed shepherd and shepherdess from falling into bed drunk at the end of the song. It has been described as lovelier in Swedish than in Boileau's original French. The epistle's humorous depiction of the human condition has been praised by critics.

Context

Song

Music and verse form 

Epistle 80 of Fredman's Epistles is dedicated to the poet and founder member of the Swedish Academy, Johan Henric Kellgren. The song has six stanzas, each of 8 lines. The rhyming pattern is ABAB-CCDD. The scholar of Swedish literature Lars Lönnroth states that the song form of the Epistle is a Siciliana, a musical pastoral piece. The music is in  time and is marked pastorale. The source melody is unknown.

Lyrics 

The song, written in 1789 or 1790, starts with a near-paraphrase of the French poet and critic Nicolas Boileau-Despréaux's classic 1674 L'Art Poetique, a guide on the construction of pastoral verse:

The Epistle's tone soon departs from Boileau, as the nymph of verse 2 is a prostitute. Furthermore, a horse appears as a symbol of erotic energy, as it does in Epistles 70 ("Movitz vik mössan högt öfver öra") and 71 ("Ulla! min Ulla! säj får jag dig bjuda"), and this is juxtaposed with a mention of Ulla Winblad. However, Bellman displays a fine feeling for nature in the Epistle.

Reception and legacy 

Bellman's biographer Paul Britten Austin describes the song "with its almost religious invocation of a shepherdess, 'clad for some solemn feast'" as "more lovely in Swedish" than in Boileau's French. He comments that in the Epistle, Bellman depicts the countryside just north of Stockholm like a John Constable painting, with "Mark how between meadows all awry/the Cot to the lake descends... Where farmer heavy on staggering wheel/Makes haste to his hearth and evening meal". However, he finds "quintessentially Swedish" the mood of high summer, with a swallow flying into the room, the cock crowing outside, and the bell of the village church ringing steadily. Everything is perfectly innocent until the last verse, when "Ulla, flat in the face of all Boileau-esque canons of what is permitted in a pastoral and forgetting all new-found respectability, falls into bed with her cavalier, both having drunk too much."

Lönnroth writes that Bellman, who had begun to observe the human condition with nature's help in earlier Epistles, brought the approach to perfection with Epistles 71 and 80. He notes that the description of the rural environment and Ulla Winblad's way of dressing both respond to the classical ideal of tasteful simplicity without frills. The song perfectly fits Boileau's pastoral idyll, until the last two verses when the "shepherd" and his "shepherdess" throw aside their conventional masks and reveal themselves as "drunk, untidy, and not specially well-brought-up".

Carina Burman comments in her biography of Bellman that Epistle 80 is one of six or seven new songs, in her view more classical in tone and better suited to print than Bellman's more strident Baroque verse of the 1770s. The Epistle has been translated into English by Eva Toller. It appears on the 1969 studio album Fred sjunger Bellman by the Bellman interpreter Fred Åkerström, re-released on CD in 1990, and on Mikael Samuelsson's 1990 Sjunger Fredmans Epistlar.

References

Sources

 
 
 
 
  (contains the most popular Epistles and Songs, with sheet music)
  (with facsimiles of sheet music from first editions in 1790, 1791)

External links 

 Text of Epistle 80 on Bellman.net
 Text of Boileau's Telle qu'une bergere on Paradis des albatros

1790 compositions
Swedish songs
Fredmans epistlar